Adriana Jiménez (born 20 January 1985) is a Mexican high diver. She participated at the 2019 World Aquatics Championships, winning a medal.

References

External links

1985 births
Living people
Female high divers
Mexican female divers
World Aquatics Championships medalists in high diving
20th-century Mexican women
21st-century Mexican women